Mehmed Saqizli (literally, Mehmed Pasha of Chios) (died 1649), (r.1631-49) was Dey and Pasha of Tripolis.
He was born into a Christian family of Greek origin on the island of Chios (known in Ottoman Turkish as Sakız, hence his epithet "Sakızlı") and had converted to Islam after living in Algeria for years.
His rule was effective, bringing peace and prosperity to Tripolitania and increasing trade. He tried to put Cyrenaica under its control, and was tolerant in religious matters, allowing the Franciscans missionaries to assist the Christian slaves. His successor was Osman Saqizli, who continued his policy.

Notes

References

See also

Pasha of Tripoli

Pashas
1649 deaths
Ottoman Tripolitania
17th-century Libyan people
Year of birth unknown
People from the Ottoman Empire of Greek descent
Converts to Islam from Eastern Orthodoxy
Greek former Christians
Politicians from Chios
Former Greek Orthodox Christians
17th-century rulers in Africa